Laurence Marks (born 8 December 1948) is a British screenwriter and one half of writing duo Marks and Gran (with Maurice Gran).

Biography 
Marks attended Holloway Comprehensive School (formerly Holloway County Grammar School until 1955). Prior to becoming a sitcom writer he was a reporter for a local weekly paper, the Tottenham Weekly Herald and, according to information he provided to Who's Who, he was also briefly a staff writer for The Sunday Times in the mid- to late 1970s. He also worked as writer/researcher for Thames Television's current affairs programme, This Week. Following a chance encounter with comedy writer Barry Took, he and childhood friend Maurice Gran got an opportunity to write a radio show for comedian Frankie Howerd, which led to their becoming full-time comedy writers.

Marks subsequently wrote with Gran the TV comedy-drama Shine on Harvey Moon (1982–85, 1995) and the popular sitcoms The New Statesman (1987–92),  Birds of a Feather (1989–98, 2014–2020) and Goodnight Sweetheart (1993–99, 2016). They are also the authors of Prudence at Number 10, a fictional diary written as though by a P.A. of UK prime minister Gordon Brown. Their theatre works include Dreamboats and Petticoats, Von Ribbentrop’s Watch, Love Me Do, Playing God, Save the Last Dance for Me, and Dreamboats and Miniskirts.

Marks is an Arsenal fan and wrote the book A Fan for All Seasons (1999), a diary of his life as a writer and an Arsenal supporter. He is a member of the Labour Party.

His father, Bernard Marks, was one of 43 people who died in the Moorgate tube crash of 1975, the deadliest accident on the London Underground. In 2006 Marks made a documentary for Channel 4 about his father and the crash. At the time of the crash, Marks was a freelance writer and in the documentary he stated that he had spent a year investigating the crash for freelance reports that appeared in The Sunday Times. Rejecting the verdict of accidental death by the coroner's jury, Marks advocated his theory that the driver of the train had committed suicide by crashing the train.

Writing credits

Awards and nominations

References

External links

1948 births
Living people
British comedy writers
British male journalists
British male television writers
British television writers
Labour Party (UK) people
People educated at Holloway School